Hughie Flint (born 15 March 1940, Manchester, Lancashire) is an English drummer, known for his stint in John Mayall & the Bluesbreakers, for his group McGuinness Flint in the early 1970s and for his subsequent association with The Blues Band.

Flint played in the Bluesbreakers on and off for five years, adding a distinctive aspect to their blues-based sound partly through his love of jazz. He appeared on their albums John Mayall Plays John Mayall (1965) and Blues Breakers with Eric Clapton (1966, also known as The Beano Album). Flint then left to play alongside Alexis Korner and Savoy Brown; his place in the group was taken by Aynsley Dunbar.

In 1970 Flint formed McGuinness Flint with Tom McGuinness, former guitarist and bassist with Manfred Mann. They reached number 2 in the UK Singles Chart with "When I'm Dead And Gone", which was followed in 1971 by another hit single, "Malt and Barley Blues", which peaked at number 5. They also released their self-titled debut album in 1970, which reached the Top 10 of the UK Albums Chart in 1971. However the early success of the group proved to be short-lived. Despite featuring the production skills of Glyn Johns and the accompaniment of pianist Nicky Hopkins, their second album Happy Birthday, Ruthy Baby proved to be the end of the original line-up. Multi-instrumentalist band members Benny Gallagher and Graham Lyle, who also wrote most of the songs, left the group following its release. Flint and McGuinness teamed up with Dennis Coulson and Dixie Dean to release the album Lo and Behold in 1972, which consisted solely of obscure Bob Dylan covers. Shortly after this Coulson left. Despite the release of two further albums and a Greatest Hits collection in 1973, the band split in 1975. Flint played with the Bonzo Dog Band from 1971 and appeared with them until their final album, Let's Make Up And Be Friendly.

In 1977 Flint was the drummer and bodhrán player on the album Suburban Ethnia by the band Chanter.

Flint's last band-based venture was The Blues Band, a supergroup whose other members were Dave Kelly, Gary Fletcher, McGuinness and another Manfred Mann veteran, singer Paul Jones. Their debut The Official Bootleg Album was released in 1980, and Flint also appeared on their follow-up albums Ready (1980) and Itchy Feet (1981) before departing.

In 1995 Flint appeared in the BBC television documentary Rock Family Trees to discuss the history of the Bluesbreakers and the many offshoots of the band. By that time he was working as a porter at Mansfield College, Oxford, from where he retired in 2007.

Flint also featured on records by Georgie Fame, Jack Dupree and Tom Newman amongst others.

References

1941 births
Living people
English rock drummers
John Mayall & the Bluesbreakers members
Musicians from Manchester
British rhythm and blues boom musicians
English blues musicians
Savoy Brown members
Chicken Shack members
The Blues Band members
McGuinness Flint members